Bowmanville GO Station is a planned GO Transit train station to be built by Metrolinx in the community of Bowmanville, Ontario. It will be the terminus station of GO Transit's approved expansion of train service on the Lakeshore East line, and will become a transit hub for Durham Region Transit and GO Transit. Approximately 770 parking spaces will be provided on the south side of the station. A bus loop and a "Kiss and Ride" area will be included. The station is expected to open in 2024.

References

External links
 GO Transit - Environmental Assessments

Future GO Transit railway stations
Railway stations in the Regional Municipality of Durham
Transport in Clarington
Proposed railway stations in Canada